Manuel Hartmann (born 26 March 1984) is a German former professional footballer who played as a midfielder.

Career
Hartmann was born in Esslingen am Neckar, Baden-Württemberg. He made his debut on the professional league level in the 2. Bundesliga for TuS Koblenz on 12 August 2007 when he came on as a half-time substitute for Frank Wiblishauser in a game against Mainz 05.

In May 2016, Hartmann signed for fifth-tier side TSV Schilksee.

References

External links
 

1984 births
Living people
People from Esslingen am Neckar
Sportspeople from Stuttgart (region)
German footballers
Association football midfielders
VfL Kirchheim/Teck players
Stuttgarter Kickers players
TuS Koblenz players
FC Ingolstadt 04 players
Holstein Kiel players
Holstein Kiel II players
2. Bundesliga players
3. Liga players
Footballers from Baden-Württemberg